Notodden Fotballklubb is a Norwegian football club located in Notodden. The team currently plays in 2. divisjon, the third tier of the Norwegian football league system.

It was founded in 1999 as a merger between the football departments of SK Snøgg and Heddal IL ahead of the 2000 season.

After playing in the 2. divisjon for several years, Notodden finally promoted to 1. divisjon ahead of the 2018 season. They promoted due to winning play-off qualification against Fredrikstad FK from 1. divisjon over two matches (0–0 away and 5–3 home).

Recent history 
{|class="wikitable"
|-bgcolor="#efefef"
! Season
! 
! Pos.
! Pl.
! W
! D
! L
! GS
! GA
! P
!Cup
!Notes
|-
|2006
|2. divisjon
|align=right bgcolor=#DDFFDD| 1
|align=right|26||align=right|16||align=right|10||align=right|0
|align=right|66||align=right|26||align=right|58
||Second round
|Promoted
|-
|2007
|1. divisjon
|align=right |9
|align=right|30||align=right|11||align=right|3||align=right|16
|align=right|49||align=right|54||align=right|36
||Fourth round
|
|-
|2008
|1. divisjon
|align=right |6
|align=right|30||align=right|12||align=right|10||align=right|8
|align=right|55||align=right|40||align=right|46
||Second round
|
|-
|2009
|1. divisjon
|align=right bgcolor="#FFCCCC"| 14
|align=right|30||align=right|9||align=right|2||align=right|19
|align=right|38||align=right|55||align=right|29
||Third round
|Relegated
|-
|2010
|2. divisjon
|align=right |2
|align=right|26||align=right|16||align=right|3||align=right|7
|align=right|71||align=right|25||align=right|51
||Second round
|
|-
|2011
|2. divisjon
|align=right bgcolor=#DDFFDD| 1
|align=right|26||align=right|22||align=right|2||align=right|2
|align=right|79||align=right|23||align=right|68
||Third round
|Promoted
|-
|2012
|1. divisjon
|align=right bgcolor="#FFCCCC"| 15
|align=right|30||align=right|6||align=right|4||align=right|20
|align=right|38||align=right|71||align=right|22
||Third round
|Relegated
|-
|2013
|2. divisjon
|align=right | 3
|align=right|26||align=right|13||align=right|3||align=right|10
|align=right|48||align=right|34||align=right|42
||First round
|
|-
|2014
|2. divisjon
|align=right | 5
|align=right|26||align=right|15||align=right|3||align=right|8
|align=right|50||align=right|42||align=right|48
||Third round
|
|-
|2015
|2. divisjon
|align=right | 5
|align=right|26||align=right|13||align=right|6||align=right|7
|align=right|68||align=right|43||align=right|45
||Third round
|
|-
|2016 
|2. divisjon
|align=right | 3
|align=right|26||align=right|13||align=right|6||align=right|7
|align=right|55||align=right|35||align=right|45
||Second round
|
|-
|2017 
|2. divisjon
|align=right bgcolor=#DDFFDD| 2
|align=right|26||align=right|17||align=right|3||align=right|6
|align=right|53||align=right|26||align=right|54
||Third round
|Promoted
|-
|2018 
|1. divisjon
|align=right | 12
|align=right|30||align=right|10||align=right|6||align=right|14
|align=right|36||align=right|40||align=right|36
||Third round
|
|-
|2019
|1. divisjon
|align=right bgcolor="#FFCCCC"| 14
|align=right|30||align=right|6||align=right|7||align=right|17
|align=right|35||align=right|53||align=right|25
||Second round
|Relegated
|-
|2020
|2. divisjon
|align=right |9
|align=right|13||align=right|5||align=right|1||align=right|7
|align=right|16||align=right|24||align=right|16
||Cancelled
|
|-
|2021
|2. divisjon
|align=right |6
|align=right|26||align=right|11||align=right|6||align=right|9
|align=right|53||align=right|43||align=right|39
||Second round
|
|-
|2022
|2. divisjon
|align=right |11
|align=right|24||align=right|6||align=right|6||align=right|12
|align=right|29||align=right|45||align=right|23
||Second round
|
|}
Source:

References

External links
  Official website
 Notodden Idrettspark – Nordic Stadiums

 
Football clubs in Norway
Association football clubs established in 1999
1999 establishments in Norway
Notodden